This is a list of authors who have written works of prose and poetry in the Russian language.

For separate lists by literary field: 
List of Russian-language novelists
List of Russian-language playwrights
List of Russian-language poets

A

Alexander Ablesimov (1742–1783), opera librettist, poet, dramatist, satirist and journalist
Fyodor Abramov (1920–1983), novelist and short story writer, Two Winters and Three Summers
Grigory Adamov (1886–1945) science fiction writer, The Mystery of the Two Oceans
Georgy Adamovich (1892–1972), poet, critic, memoirist, translator
Anastasia Afanasieva (born 1982), physician, poet, writer & translator
Alexander Afanasyev (1826–1871), folklorist who recorded and published over 600 Russian folktales and fairytales, Russian Fairy Tales
Alexander Afanasyev-Chuzhbinsky (1816–1875), poet, writer, ethnographer and translator
Alexander Afinogenov (1904–1941), playwright, A Far Place
M. Ageyev (1898–1973), pseudonymous writer, Novel with Cocaine
Chinghiz Aitmatov (1928–2008), Kyrgyz novelist and short story writer, Jamilya, The Day Lasts More Than a Hundred Years
David Aizman (1869–1922), Russian-Jewish writer and playwright
Bella Akhmadulina (1937–2010), poet, short story writer, and translator, The String
Anna Akhmatova (1889–1966), acmeist poet, Requiem, Poem Without a Hero
Ivan Aksakov (1823–1886), journalist, slavophile 
Konstantin Aksakov (1817–1860), playwright, critic and writer, slavophile
Sergey Aksakov (1791–1859), novelist and miscellaneous writer, The Scarlet Flower
Vasily Aksyonov (1932–2009), novelist and short story writer, Generations of Winter
Boris Akunin (born 1956), author, essayist, translator and literary critic, Erast Fandorin series, Sister Pelagia series
Mikhail Albov, (1851–1911), novelist and short story writer
Mark Aldanov (died 1957), historical novelist
Andrey Aldan-Semenov (1908–1985), Gulag memoirist
Mikhail Alekseyev (1918–2007) writer and editor, My Stalingrad
Sholem Aleichem (1859–1916), Russian Jewish writer, Wandering Stars
Margarita Aliger (1915–1992), poet, translator, and journalist, Zoya
Yuz Aleshkovsky (1929–2022), writer, poet, playwright and performer of his own songs, Kangaroo
Boris Almazov (1827–1876), poet, translator and literary critic
Alexander Amfiteatrov (1862–1938), writer and historian, Napoleonder
Daniil Andreyev (1906–1959), writer, poet, and Christian mystic, Roza Mira
Leonid Andreyev (1871–1919), novelist, playwright and short story writer, The Seven Who Were Hanged, The Life of Man
Sergey Andreyevsky (1847–1918), writer, poet, literary critic, The Book on Death  
Irakly Andronikov (1908–1990), writer, historian, philologist and media personality
Anna Mitrofanovna Aníchkova (1868/1869 – 1935), writer and translator who wrote under the pseudonym Ivan Strannik
Pavel Annenkov (1813–1887), critic and memoirist, The Extraordinary Decade 
Yury Annenkov (1889–1974), artist and writer, A Tale of Trivia 
Innokenty Annensky (1855–1909), poet, critic and translator, representative of the first wave of Russian Symbolism
Lev Anninsky (1934–2019) writer, literary historian and critic
Pavel Antokolsky (1896–1978), poet, All We Who in His Name
Maxim Antonovich (1835–1918), critic, essayist, memoirist, translator and philosopher
Elena Apreleva (1846–1923), writer, memoirist, playwright, Guilty without Guilt
Aleksey Apukhtin (1840–1893), poet and writer, From Death to Life
Maria Arbatova (born 1957), novelist, short story writer, playwright, poet and journalist
Aleksei Arbuzov (1908–1986), playwright, A Long Road
Vladimir Arnoldi (1871–1924), children's author and professor of biology
Mikhail Artsybashev (1878–1927), naturalist writer and playwright, Sanin
Nikolai Aseev (1889–1963), futurist poet, Night Flute
Viktor Astafyev (1924–2001), novelist and short story writer, Sad Detective
Lera Auerbach (Averbakh) (born 1973), poet, writer and composer
Mikhail Avdeev (1821–1876), novelist and playwright, Tamarin trilogy
Arkady Averchenko (1881–1925), satirical writer and playwright, Ninochka
Vasily Avseenko (1842–1913), writer, journalist and literary critic
Hizgil Avshalumov (1913–2001), Soviet novelist, poet and playwright
Gennadiy Aygi (1934–2006), Chuvash poet and translator
Vasily Azhayev (1915–1968), novelist, Far from Moscow

B

Semyon Babayevsky (1909–2000), novelist and short story writer, Golden Star Chavalier
Isaak Babel (1894–1940), short story writer, The Odessa Tales, Red Cavalry
Eduard Bagritsky (1895–1934), constructivist poet, February
Grigory Baklanov (1923–2009), novelist and magazine editor, Forever Nineteen
Ivan Bakhtin (1756–1818), poet, satirist and politician
Mikhail Bakhtin (1895–1975), philosopher, literary critic, semiotician and scholar, "Epic and Novel"
Mikhail Bakunin (1814–1876), revolutionary and theorist of collectivist anarchism, God and the State, Statism and Anarchy
Konstantin Balmont (1867–1942), symbolist poet and translator, Burning Buildings, Let Us Be Like the Sun 
Jurgis Baltrušaitis (1873–1944), poet and translator, The Pendulum
Kazimir Barantsevich (1851–1927), writer and poet, Family Hearth
Yevgeny Baratynsky (1800–1844), poet, The Gipsy
Natalya Baranskaya (1908–2004), novelist and short story writer, A Week Like Any Other
Ivan Barkov (1732–1768), comic and erotic poet, Luka Mudischev
Anna Barkova (1901–1976), poet and writer, Gulag survivor
Elpidifor Barsov (1836–1917), literary historian, ethnographer, folklorist, philologist
Agniya Barto (1906–1981), Russian-Jewish poet and children's writer
Alexander Bashlachev (1960–1988), poet, musician, guitarist, and singer-songwriter
Fyodor Batyushkov (1857–1920), philologist, essayist, literary and theatre historian
Konstantin Batyushkov (1787–1855), poet, essayist and translator 
Nikolai Bazhin (1843–1908), writer, journalist and critic, The History of One People's Partnership
Pavel Bazhov (1879–1950), fairy tale author, The Malachite Casket
Demyan Bedny (1883–1945), poet and satirist, New Testament Without Defects 
Dmitry Begichev (1786–1855), writer and politician
Alexander Bek (1903–1972), novelist, And Not to Die
Vissarion Belinsky (1811–1848), writer, literary critic and philosopher
Vasily Belov (1932–2012), writer, poet and dramatist, Eves, The Year of a Major Breakdown
Andrei Bely (1880–1934), symbolist poet, writer and essayist, The Silver Dove, Petersburg
Alexander Belyayev (1884–1942), science fiction author, Amphibian Man
Vladimir Benediktov (1807–1873); poet and translator
Nina Berberova (1901–1993), novelist and short story writer, The Book of Happiness
Nikolai Berg (1823–1884), poet, journalist, translator and historian
Olga Bergholz (1910–1975), poet, playwright and memoirist
Alexander Bestuzhev (1797–1837), novelist, short story writer and Decembrist, An Evening on Bivouac
Vitaly Bianki (1894–1959), nature and children's writer
Aleksei Bibik (1878–1976), working-class novelist and short story writer
Andrei Bitov (1937–2018), novelist and short story writer, Pushkin House
Nikolai Blagoveshchensky (1837–1889), writer, journalist and biographer
Helena Blavatsky (1831–1891), a founder of Theosophy and the Theosophical Society, The Secret Doctrine, Isis Unveiled
Pyotr Blinov (1913–1942), Udmurt writer and journalist 
Alexander Blok (1880–1921), poet, "The Twelve"
Pyotr Boborykin (1836–1921), writer, playwright and journalist, China Town
Oleg Bogayev (born 1970), playwright, The Russian National Postal Service
Andrei Bogdanov (1692–1766), bibliographer and ethnographer 
Alexander Bogdanov (1873–1928), novelist, physician, economist and philosopher, Red Star
Vladimir Bogomolov (1926–2003), novelist and short story writer, Ivan
Vladimir Bogoraz (1865–1936), revolutionary, writer and anthropologist
Yuri Bondarev (1924–2020), novelist and short story writer, The Shore
Leonid Borodin (1938–2011), novelist and journalist, The Story of a Strange Time
Genrikh Borovik (born 1929), publicist, writer, playwright and filmmaker
Vasily Botkin (1812–1869), critic, essayist and translator
Valeri Brainin-Passek (born 1948), Russian/German musicologist, music manager, composer and poet
Osip Brik (1888–1945), avant garde writer and literary critic
Joseph Brodsky (1940–1996), poet and essayist, Nobel Prize Winner
Valery Bryusov (1873–1924), poet, novelist and short story writer, The Fiery Angel
Yury Buida (born 1954), novelist and short story writer, The Zero Train
Vladimir Bukovsky (1942–2019), writer and dissident
Mikhail Bulgakov (1891–1940), novelist, short story writer and playwright, Heart of a Dog, The White Guard, The Master and Margarita
Faddey Bulgarin (1789–1859), Polish-born writer and journalist
Kir Bulychev (1934–2003), science fiction author, Half a Life
Ivan Bunin (1870–1953), first Russian winner of the Nobel Prize for Literature, The Village, The Life of Arseniev, Dark Avenues
Anna Bunina (1774–1829), poet, Though Poverty's No Stain
Viktor Burenin (1841–1926), writer, critic, playwright, librettist and satirical poet
David Burliuk (1882–1967), illustrator, publicist and author associated with Russian Futurism
Dmitry Bykov (born 1967)
Pyotr Bykov (1844–1930) literary historian, poet and translator
Vasil Bykov (1924-2003)

C

Dimitrie Cantemir (1673–1723), philosopher, historian, composer, musicologist, linguist, ethnographer and geographer
Catherine the Great, (1729–1796), patroness of the arts, music and theatre, and opera librettist, Fevey
Pyotr Chaadayev (1794–1856), philosopher, Philosophical Letters 
Aleksey Chapygin (1870–1937), novelist and short story writer, Stepan Razin
Lidia Charskaya (1875–1938), novelist and actress
Nikolai Chayev (1824–1914), writer, poet and playwright, Svat Faddeyich
Alexander Chekhov (1855–1913), writer and journalist
Anton Chekhov (1860–1904), short story writer and playwright, The Seagull, The Cherry Orchard, "Ward No. 6", The Lady with the Dog"
Nikolay Chernyshevsky (1828–1889), writer, journalist and politician, What Is to Be Done?
Evgeny Chirikov (1864–1932), novelist, short story writer and playwright, The Magician
Sasha Chorny (1880–1932), poet, satirist and children's writer 
Korney Chukovsky (1882–1969), children's poet, Wash'em'clean
Lydia Chukovskaya (1907–1996), writer and poet, Sofia Petrovna
Georgy Chulkov (1879–1939), poet, editor, writer and critic

D

Denis Davydov (1784–1839), soldier-poet of the Napoleonic Wars
Vladimir Dal (1801–1872), writer and lexicographer, Explanatory Dictionary
Yuli Daniel (1925–1988), dissident writer, poet and translator, This is Moscow Speaking 
Grigory Danilevsky (1829–1890), historical and ethnographical novelist, Moscow in Flames
Anton Delvig (1798–1831), poet, journalist and magazine editor
Grigoriy Demidovtsev (born 1960), writer and playwright
Andrey Dementyev (1928–2018), poet and writer
Boris Derevensky (born 1962), writer and historian
Regina Derieva (1949–2013), poet, writer and essayist
Gavrila Derzhavin (1743–1816), poet and statesman, Let the Thunder of Victory Sound!
 Nikolai Devitte (1811–1844), poet, harpist and songwriter, Not for Me.
Andrei Dmitriev (born 1956), novelist and short story writer, winner of the 2012 Russian Booker Prize
Ivan Dmitriev (1760–1837), sentimentalist poet and Russian Minister of Justice 
Valentina Dmitryeva (1859–1947), writer, doctor and teacher, Hveska, the Doctor's Watchman
Nikolay Dobrolyubov (1836–1861), literary critic, journalist, poet and essayist 
Leonid Dobychin (1894–1936), novelist and short story writer, The Town of N
Yevgeniy Dolmatovsky (1915–1994) poet and songwriter 
Yury Dombrovsky (1909–1978), poet, writer and Gulag survivor, The Faculty of Useless Knowledge
Vlas Doroshevich (1864–1922), journalist, writer and drama critic, The Way of the Cross  
Lyubov Dostoyevskaya (1869–1926), novelist and biographer, The Emigrant
Fyodor Dostoyevsky (1821–1881), writer, essayist, journalist and editor, Notes from Underground, Crime and Punishment, The Idiot, Demons, The Brothers Karamazov, The House of the Dead, The Gambler, "White Nights", "A Gentle Creature", "The Dream of a Ridiculous Man"
Mikhail Dostoyevsky (1820–1864), writer, critic and editor, Vremya
Sergei Dovlatov (1941–1990), novelist, short story writer and journalist, Affiliate
Spiridon Drozhzhin (1848–1930), poet, At the Village Assembly 
Yulia Drunina (1924–1991), poet and politician
Alexander Druzhinin (1824–1864), writer and magazine editor, Polinka Saks
Vladimir Dudintsev (1918–1998), novelist, Not by Bread Alone
Sergey Durov (1816–1869), poet, translator, writer, and political activist
Nadezhda Durova (1783–1866), soldier and writer, The Cavalry Maiden

E

Yevgeny Edelson (1824–1868), literary critic, essayist and translator 
Ilya Ehrenburg (1891–1967), novelist and WWII war correspondent, The Black Book, The Thaw
Natan Eidelman (1930–1989), author, biographer and historian
Grigory Eliseev (1821–1891) essayist, historian, editor, and publisher.
Sergey Elpatyevsky (1854–1933), novelist and short story writer, Pity Me!
Nikolai Engelhardt (1867–1942), writer, critic, poet, journalist and memoirist
Asar Eppel (1935–2012), writer and translator, Red Caviar Sandwiches
Nikolai Erdman (1900–1970), playwright, The Suicide
Victor Erofeyev (born 1947), writer, literary critic and magazine editor, Russian Beauty 
Alexander Ertel (1855–1908), novelist and short story writer, A Greedy Peasant
Mikhail Evstafiev (born 1963), artist, photographer and writer, Two Steps from Heaven
Nikolai Evreinov (1879–1953), director, dramatist and theatre practitioner, The Storming of the Winter Palace

F

Alexander Fadeyev (1901–1956), novelist, known for his war fiction, The Rout, The Young Guard 
Konstantin Fedin (1892–1977), novelist, Cities and Years
Georgy Fedotov (1886–1951), religious philosopher, historian and essayist
Afanasy Fet (1820–1892), poet and translator
Vera Figner (1852–1942), revolutionary and writer, member of Narodnaya Volya
Terty Filippov (1825–1899) folklorist, essayist, editor and pedagogue 
Dmitry Filosofov (1872–1940) essayist, critic, religious thinker, editor and political activist 
Konstantin Fofanov (1862–1911), poet, considered to be a precursor of the symbolists, Shadows and Mystery 
Denis Fonvizin (1744–1792), dramatist, The Minor
Olga Forsh (1873–1961), writer, dramatist, memoirist and scenarist, Palace and Prison
Ruvim Frayerman (1891–1972) writer, poet, essayist and journalist, Wild Dog Dingo
Dmitry Furmanov (1891–1926), writer, known for his Russian Civil War novel Chapayev

G

Cherubina de Gabriak (1887–1928), pseudonymous poet
Arkady Gaidar (1904–1941), children's writer, Timur and His Squad
Alexey Galakhov (1807–1892), writer, memoirist and literary historian, The History of Russian Literature
Alexander Galich (1918–1977), poet, screenwriter, playwright and singer-songwriter
Alisa Ganieva (pseudonym Gulla Khirachev) (born 1985), writer and essayist
Nikolai Garin-Mikhailovsky (1852–1906), writer, essayist and engineer, Practical Training 
Vsevolod Garshin (1855–1888), short story writer, "Four Days", "The Red Flower"
Aleksei Gastev (1882–1939), avant garde poet  
Gaito Gazdanov (1903–1971), novelist and short story writer, An Evening with Claire, The Spectre of Alexander Wolf
Mikhail Gerasimov (1889–1939), working-class poet 
Yuri German (1910–1967), writer, playwright, screenwriter and journalist, The Cause You Serve
Vladimir Gilyarovsky (1853–1935), writer and journalist, The Stories of the Slums 
Lidiya Ginzburg (1902–1990), literary critic and a survivor of the Siege of Leningrad, Blockade Diary
Yevgenia Ginzburg (1904–1977), Gulag memoirist, Journey into the Whirlwind, Within the Whirlwind
Zinaida Gippius (1869–1945), essayist, memoirist, writer, poet and playwright, The Green Ring
Anatoly Gladilin (1935–2018), novelist, Moscow Racetrack
Fyodor Gladkov (1883–1958), novelist and short story writer, Cement
Nikolay Glazkov (1919–1979), poet, creator of the term "Samizdat"
Fyodor Glinka (1786–1880), poet and playwright, Karelia
Boris Glinsky (1860–1917) writer, publicist, publisher, editor and politician 
Dmitry Glukhovsky (born 1979), writer and journalist, Metro 2033 
Nikolay Gnedich (1784–1833), poet and translator, The Fishers 
Pyotr Gnedich (1855–1925), novelist, poet, playwright, translator, theatre entrepreneur and art historian
Nikolai Gogol (1809–1852), writer and dramatist, Evenings on a Farm Near Dikanka, The Government Inspector, Dead Souls
Arseny Golenishchev-Kutuzov (1848–1913), poet, Songs and Dances of Death 
Boris Golovin (born 1955), singer-songwriter, musician, poet and novelist
Ivan Goncharov (1812–1891), novelist, Oblomov
Natalya Gorbanevskaya (1936–2013), poet, translator and civil rights activist
Ivan Gorbunov (1831–1896), writer and stage actor, The Scenes from People's Life
Dmitry Gorchakov (1758–1824), poet, playwright and satirist
Grigori Gorin (1940–2000), writer, playwright and screenwriter, The Very Same Munchhausen 
Maxim Gorky (1868–1936), novelist, short story writer and playwright, The Lower Depths, Mother, My Childhood. In the World. My Universities, The Life of Klim Samgin
Nina Gorlanova (born 1947), novelist and short story writer
Sergey Gorodetsky (1884–1967), poet, one of the founders of the acmeist school
Daniil Granin (1919–2017), novelist, Those Who Seek
Nikolay Gretsch (1787–1867), journalist, writer and magazine editor, Northern Bee
Aleksander Griboyedov (1795–1828), dramatist and statesman, Woe from Wit
Dmitry Grigorovich (1822–1900), novelist, The Fishermen
Oleg Grigoriev (1943–1992), poet and artist
Apollon Grigoryev (1822–1864), poet, literary and theatrical critic, translator and memoirist
Alexander Grin (1880–1932), author of novels and stories set in Grinlandia, Scarlet Sails
Isabella Grinevskaya (1864–1944), poet, writer and playwright
Vasily Grossman (1905–1964), writer and war correspondent, Life and Fate
Vitali Gubarev (1912–1981), journalist and writer
Igor Guberman (born 1936), writer and satirical poet
Semyon Gudzenko (1922–1953), poet of the World War II generation
Lev Gumilev (1912–1992), historian, ethnologist and anthropologist
Nikolay Gumilev (1886–1921), poet, founder of the acmeist movement
Elena Guro (1877–1913), futurist writer and painter, The Hurdy-Gurdy
Andrei Gusev (born 1952), writer and journalist, The World According to Novikoff
Sergey Gusev-Orenburgsky (1867–1963), novelist, The Land of the Fathers

H

Yelena Hahn, writer for Biblioteka Dlya Chteniya and Otechestvennye Zapiski, mother of Helena Blavatsky
Alexander Herzen (1812–1870), essayist, novelist, philosopher and magazine editor, Who is to Blame?

I

Ilf and Petrov (Ilf 1897–1937) (Petrov 1903–1942), satirical writers, The Twelve Chairs, The Little Golden Calf
Vera Inber (1890–1972), poet and writer, Lalla's Interests
Mikhail Isakovsky (1900–1973), poet and songwriter, Katyusha
Fazil Iskander, (1929–2016), Abkhaz writer, Sandro of Chegem
Alexei Ivanov (born 1969), novelist and screenwriter
Georgy Ivanov (1894–1958), poet and essayist, Disintegration of the Atom
Vsevolod Ivanov (1895–1963), writer and plawright, Armoured Train 14-69
Vyacheslav Ivanov (1866–1949), poet, playwright, philosopher, translator and literary critic
Yuri Ivask (1907–1986), poet, essayist, literary critic and historian
Ryurik Ivnev (1891–1981), poet, novelist and translator
Sergey Izgiyayev (1922–1972), poet, playwright and translator
Alexander Izmaylov (1779–1831), fabulist, poet and novelist

K

Gavril Kamenev (1772–1803), poet, writer and translator
Vasily Kamensky (1884–1961), poet, playwright and artist, one of the first Russian aviators
Antiochus Kantemir (1708–1744), writer and poet, On the Envy and Pride of Evil-Minded Courtiers
Nikolay Karamzin (1766–1826), poet, writer and historian, Poor Liza
Alexander Karasyov (born 1971), writer, Russian War Prose
Pyotr Karatygin (1805–1879), playwright, actor and memoirist
Nikolay Karazin (1842–1908), painter and writer, The Two-Legged Wolf
Nikolay Karonin-Petropavlovsky (1853–1892), narodnik writer, First Storm
Evtikhy Pavlovich Karpov (1857–1926), playwright and theatre director
Vladimir Karpov (1922–2010), novelist and magazine editor, The Commander
Vasily Kapnist (1758–1823), poet and playwright, Chicane
Lev Kassil (1905–1970), writer of juvenile and young adult literature
Ivan Kataev (1902–1937), novelist and short story writer, Immortality
Valentin Kataev (1897–1986), writer and playwright, Time, Forward!
Pavel Katenin (1792–1853), classicist poet, dramatist and literary critic
Mikhail Katkov (1818–1887), journalist and publicist, Moscow News
Veniamin Kaverin (1902–1989), novelist, The Two Captains
Emmanuil Kazakevich (1913–1962), writer, poet and playwright, The Blue Notebook
Yury Kazakov (1927–1982), short story writer, Going To Town
Rimma Kazakova (1932–2008), poet, Let's Meet in the East 
Dmitri Kedrin (1907–1945), poet, Confession
Yuri Khanon (born 1965), novelist and eccentric, Skryabin As a Face
Mark Kharitonov (born 1937), writer, poet, and translator, Lines of Fate
Yevgeny Kharitonov (1941–1981), writer, poet, playwright and theater director
Daniil Kharms (1905–1942), novelist, short story writer and playwright, The Old Woman, Incidences, Elizaveta Bam
Ivan Khemnitser (1745–1784), satirical poet, The Rich Man and the Poor Man
Mikhail Kheraskov (1733–1807), poet, writer and playwright, Vladimir Reborn
Velimir Khlebnikov (1885–1922), futurist poet and author, Incantation by Laughter
Nikolai Khmelnitsky (1789–1845), playwright, literary critic and translator, Chatterbox
Vladislav Khodasevich (1886–1939), poet and literary critic 
Aleksey Khomyakov (1804–1860), poet, co-founder of the slavophile movement 
Nadezhda Khvoshchinskaya (1824–1889), writer, critic and translator, The Boarding-School Girl
Ivan Kireyevsky (1806–1856), writer, co-founder of the slavophile movement
Dmitry Khvostov (1757–1835), poet and fabulist 
Vladimir Kirshon (1902–1938), playwright, The Miraculous Alloy
Marusya Klimova (born 1961), writer and translator
Daniel Kluger (born 1951), author and songwriter
Nikolai Klyuev (1884–1937), peasant poet, A Northern Poem
Viktor Klyushnikov (1841–1892), writer, editor and journalist, The Haze
Yakov Knyazhnin (1740/42–1791), playwright, poet and translator, The Braggart 
Vsevolod Kochetov (1912–1973), novelist and journalist, The Zhurbin Family
Pavel Kogan (1918–1942), poet and military interpreter
Ivan Kokorev (1825–1853), short story writer and essayist
Alexandra Kollontai (1872–1952), writer, feminist and important political figure, Love of Worker Bees
Aleksey Koltsov (1809–1842), poet, An Old Man's Song
Mikhail Koltsov (1898–1940/42), journalist and satirist
Fyodor Koni (1809–1889), dramatist, theatre critic, literary historian, editor and memoirist
Evgenia Konradi (1838–1898), essayist, journalist, writer, and women's education advocate
Lev Kopelev (1912–1997), writer, journalist and dissident  
Apollon Korinfsky (1868–1937), writer, poet, essayist, translator and memoirist
Oleksandr Korniychuk (1905–1972), playwright, literary critic and state official, In the Steppes of Ukraine 
Vladimir Korolenko (1853–1921), writer and memoirist, The Blind Musician
Nestor Kotlyarevsky (1863–1925), writer, publicist, literary critic and historian, The Nineteenth Century
Arkady Kots (1872–1943), poet and translator, Proletarian Songs 
Yury Koval (1938–1995), writer and artist
Sofia Kovalevskaya (1859–1891), writer and mathematician, Nihilist Girl
Vadim Kozhevnikov (1909–1984), novelist and short story writer, Shield and Sword
Nadezhda Kozhevnikova (born 1949), writer and journalist, Attorney Alexandra Tikhonovna 
Ivan Kozlov (1779–1840), poet and translator, The Monk 
Eugene Kozlovsky (born 1946), writer, journalist, theatre director and film director
Vasili Krasovsky (1782–1824), poet, Scrolls of the Muse
Andrey Krayevsky (1810–1889), journalist, publicist, publisher and editor, Otechestvennye Zapiski
Vsevolod Krestovsky (1840–1895), writer, Knights of Industry
Peter Kropotkin (1842–1921), writer and anarchist theorist, In Russian and French Prisons
Aleksei Kruchenykh (1886–1968), futurist poet, co-creator of the literary concept "Zaum"
Vladimir Krupin (born 1941), writer, editor and religious author, Aqua Vitae
Ivan Krylov (1769–1844), major fabulist and dramatist
Gleb Krzhizhanovsky (1872–1959), poet, author of the Russian version of the Warszawianka
Sigizmund Krzhizhanovsky (1887–1950), short story writer, Quadraturin
Anatoly Kudryavitsky (born 1954), poet and novelist
Pyotr Kudryavtsev (1816–1858), writer, historian, literary critic, philologist and journalist
Nestor Kukolnik (1809–1868), playwright, poet and librettist, A Life for the Tsar
Aleksandr Kuprin (1870–1938), novelist and short story writer, The Duel
Wilhelm Küchelbecker (1797–1846), poet and magazine editor, Mnemozina
Nikolai Kurochkin (1830–1884), poet, editor, translator and essayist
Vasily Kurochkin (1831–1875), satirical poet, journalist and translator
Vladimir Kurochkin (1829–1885), dramatist, translator, editor and publisher 
Ivan Kushchevsky (1847–1876), novelist and short story writer, Nikolai Negorev
Alexander Kushner (born 1936), poet and essayist, The First Impression 
Dmitry Kuzmin (born 1968), poet, critic and publisher
Mikhail Kuzmin (1872–1936), poet and novelist, Wings
Anatoly Kuznetsov (1929–1979), novelist, Babi Yar: A Document in the Form of a Novel

L

Lazar Lagin (1903–1979), satirist and children's writer, Old Khottabych
Yuri Laptev (1903–1984), writer and journalist, Zarya
Yulia Latynina (born 1966), writer and journalist, The Insider
Boris Lavrenyov (1891–1959), writer and playwright, Such a Simple Thing
Pyotr Lavrov (1823–1900), prominent theorist of narodism, philosopher, publicist and sociologist.
Ivan Lazhechnikov (1792–1869), historical novelist, The Heretic
Vasily Lebedev-Kumach (1898–1949), poet and lyricist, Serdtse
Anatoly Leman (1859–1913), writer and editor, The Gentry's Tale
Leonid Leonov (1899–1994), major novelist and short story writer, The Thief
Konstantin Leontiev (1831–1891), philosopher and essayist
Mikhail Lermontov (1814–1841), major poet, playwright and novelist, A Hero of Our Time
Nikolai Leskov (1831–1895), novelist, short story writer and journalist, Lady Macbeth of the Mtensk District, The Cathedral Clergy, The Enchanted Wanderer
Alexander Levitov (1835–1877), short story writer, Leatherhide the Cobbler
Nikolay Leykin (1841–1906), writer and publisher, Fragments Magazine 
Vladimir Lichutin (born 1940), writer and essayist
Viktor Likhonosov (1936–2021), writer and editor, Unwritten Memoirs. Our Little Paris. 
Eduard Limonov (1943–2020), writer and dissident, It's Me, Eddie
Dmitri Lipskerov (born 1964), writer and playwright, The Forty Years of Changzhoeh 
Mirra Lokhvitskaya (1869–1905), poet and playwright
Mikhail Lomonosov (1711–1765), polymath, scientist, writer and linguistic reformer
Vladimir Lugovskoy (1901–1957), constructivist poet 
Sergey Lukyanenko (born 1968), popular science-fiction and fantasy author, The Stars Are Cold Toys
Anatoly Lunacharsky (1875–1933), journalist and publicist
Lev Lunts (1901–1924), writer, playwright, essayist and critic, member of the Serapion Brothers

M

Grigori Machtet (1852–1901), novelist, short story writer and poet 
Vladimir Makanin (1937–2017), novelist and short story writer, Antileader
Sergey Malitsky (born 1962), fantasy fiction writer
Dmitry Mamin-Sibiryak (1852–1912), novelist, The Privalov Fortune
Nadezhda Mandelstam (1899–1980), writer and memoirist, Hope Against Hope, Hope Abandoned
Osip Mandelstam (1891–1938), poet and writer, member of the acmeist school, The Stone
Anatoly Marienhof (1897–1962), novelist, poet and playwright, A Novel Without Lies
Alexandra Marinina (born 1957), writer of detective stories
Evgeny Markov (1835–1903), writer, critic and ethnographer, Black Earth Field
Maria Markova (born 1982), poet
Boleslav Markevich (1822–1884), writer, essayist, journalist, literary critic and translator
Samuil Marshak (1887–1964), writer, translator and children's poet, The Twelve Months
Vladilen Mashkovtsev (1929–1997), poet, writer and journalist
Mikhail Matinsky (1750–1820), scientist, dramatist, librettist and opera composer.
Vladimir Mayakovsky (1893–1930), futurist poet, writer and playwright, Mystery-Bouffe
Apollon Maykov (1821–1897), poet and translator
Valerian Maykov (1823–1847), literary critic, brother of Apollon Maykov 
Vasily Maykov (1728–1778), poet, fabulist, playwright and translator
Lev Mei (1822–1862), poet and playwright, The Tsar's Bride
Pavel Melnikov (1818–1883), ethnographical novelist, In the Forests
Dmitry Merezhkovsky (1866–1941), poet and novelist, Christ and Antichrist
Aleksey Merzlyakov (1778–1830), poet, critic, translator and professor
Arvo Mets (1937–1997), poet and translator, Resemblance
Alexander Mezhirov (1923–2009), poet, translator and critic
Sergey Mikhalkov (1913–2009), children's writer, satirist and songwriter, author of the National Anthem of the Soviet Union 
Nikolay Mikhaylovsky (1842–1904), publicist, literary critic, sociologist and narodnik theoretician
Dmitry Minayev (1835–1889), satirical poet, journalist, translator and literary critic
Nikolai Minsky (1855–1937), poet, writer and translator, From the Gloom to the Light 
Boris Mozhayev (1923–1996), writer, playwright, script-writer and editor, Alive
Daniil Mordovtsev (1830–1905), writer and historian of Ukrainian descent
Yunna Morits (born 1937), poet and artist, The Vine
Sergey Mstislavsky (1876–1943), writer, dramatist, publicist, anthropologist, editor and political activist
Viktor Muyzhel (1880–1924), writer and painter
Viktor Muravin (born 1929), novelist, The Diary of Vikenty Angarov

N

Vladimir Nabokov (1899–1977), poet and novelist, wrote first in Russian, then in English, author of Lolita
Nikolai Nadezhdin (1804–1856), literary critic and ethnographer
Semyon Nadson (1862–1887), poet, Pity the Stately Cypress Trees
Yuri Nagibin (1920–1994), novelist, short story writer and screenwriter
Vladimir Narbut (1888–1938), acmeist poet and magazine editor
Vasily Narezhny (1780–1825), novelist, A Russian Gil Blas
Sergey Narovchatov (1919–1981), writer and magazine editor, Novy Mir
Nikolai Naumov, (1838–1901), essayist and short story writer, Cobweb
Filipp Nefyodov (1838–1902), writer, journalist, editor, ethnographer and archeologist, Among People
Nikolay Nekrasov (1821–1878), major poet and magazine editor, Who Can be Happy and Free in Russia?
Viktor Nekrasov (1911–1987), novelist, Front-line Stalingrad
Viktor Nekipelov (1928–1989), poet, writer and dissident 
Miroslav Nemirov (1961–2016), poet and songwriter
Vasily Nemirovich-Danchenko (1845–1936), novelist, essayist and war correspondent 
Vladimir Nemirovich-Danchenko (1858–1943), theatre director, writer and playwright, co-founder of the Moscow Art Theatre
Löb Nevakhovich (1776/78–1831), Russia-Jewish writer and playwright
Alexander Neverov (1886–1923), writer and playwright, City of Bread
Friedrich Neznansky (1932–2013), crime novelist, Red Square
Ivan Nikitin (1824–1861), poet and writer, Kulak
Nikolai Nikolev (1758–1815), poet and playwright
Pavel Nilin (1908–1981), writer, journalist and playwright, Man Goes Uphill
Nikolay Nosov (1908–1976), children's writer, Neznaika
Yevgeny Nosov (1925–2002), writer, Usvyat Warriors
Osip Notovich (1849–1914), publisher, playwright and essayist
Alexey Novikov-Priboy (1877–1944), novelist and short story writer, The Captain

O

Vladimir Obruchev (1863–1956), science fiction writer, Sannikov Land
Alexander Odoevsky (1802–1839), poet and playwright, activist of the Decembrist Revolt
Vladimir Odoevsky (1803–1869), philosopher, writer, music critic, philanthropist and pedagogue, The Living Corpse 
Irina Odoyevtseva (1895–1990), poet, novelist and memoirist
Nikolay Ogarev (1813–1877), poet, historian and political activist
Bulat Okudzhava (1924–1997), poet, writer and singer-songwriter, The Art of Needles and Sins
Yury Olesha (1899–1960), novelist and short story writer, Envy
Nikolay Oleynikov (1898–1937), editor, avant-garde poet and playwright 
Vladimir Orlov (author) (1936–2014), novelist
Mikhail Osorgin (1878–1942), journalist, novelist, short story writer and essayist
Sergey Ostrovoy (1911–2005), poet, author of lyrics to many popular Soviet songs
Alexander Ostrovsky (1823–1886), major playwright, The Storm
Nikolai Ostrovsky (1904–1936), socialist realist writer, How the Steel Was Tempered 
Valentin Ovechkin (1904–1968), writer, playwright, journalist and war correspondent, Greetings from the Front
Vladislav Ozerov (1769–1816), playwright, Dmitry Donskoy

P

Marina Palei (born 1955), scriptwriter, publicist, novelist and translator, Rendezvous
Alexander Palm (1822–1885), poet, novelist and playwright, Petrashevsky Circle member, Alexey Slobodin
Liodor Palmin (1841–1891), poet, translator and journalist 
Ivan Panaev (1812–1862), writer, critic and publisher/editor of Sovremennik magazine
Avdotya Panaeva (1820–1893), novelist, short story writer and memoirist
Vera Panova (1905–1973), novelist, short story writer, journalist and playwright, Seryozha
Valentin Parnakh (1891–1951), poet, translator, choreographer and musician, founder of Russian jazz music
Sophia Parnok (1885–1933),  poet, playwright and translator
Andrei Parshev (born 1955), political writer
Boris Pasternak (1890–1960), poet and novelist, not permitted by the Soviet Union to accept the Nobel Prize, Doctor Zhivago
Pyotr Patrushev (1942–2016), writer and dissident
Konstantin Paustovsky (1892–1968), writer, Nobel Prize nominee, Story of a Life
Pyotr Pavlenko (1899–1951), writer, Happiness
Oleg Pavlov (1970–2018), novelist and short story writer
Karolina Pavlova (1807–1893), poet and novelist, A Double Life 
Vladimir Pecherin (1807–1885), poet and writer, Notes from Beyond the Tomb
Victor Pelevin (born 1962), modern writer, Omon Ra
Yakov Perelman (1882–1942), science writer, Physics for Entertainment
Pyotr Pertsov (1868–1947), publisher, editor, literary critic, journalist and memoirist
Nick Perumov (born 1963), fantasy and science fiction writer
Pyotr Petrov (1827–1891), writer, arts historian, genealogist and bibliographer, The Tsar's Judgement
Mariya Petrovykh (1908–1979), poet and translator
Lyudmila Petrushevskaya (born 1938), modern writer and playwright, The Time: Night 
Valentin Pikul (1928–1990), novelist, At the Last Frontier 
Boris Pilnyak (1894–1938), novelist, The Naked Year
Dmitry Pisarev (1840–1868), critic and publicist
Aleksey Pisemsky (1821–1881), novelist and dramatist, A Bitter Fate
Andrei Platonov (1899–1951), novelist, short story writer and playwright, Chevengur, The Foundation Pit
Georgi Plekhanov (1857–1918), writer, revolutionary and Marxist theoretician 
Aleksey Pleshcheyev (1825–1893), radical poet, Step Forward! Without Fear or Doubt
Pyotr Pletnyov (1792–1866), poet, dedicatee of Pushkin's Eugene Onegin
Mikhail Pogodin (1800–1875), historian and journalist 
Nikolai Pogodin (1900–1962), playwright, journalist and magazine editor
Antony Pogorelsky (1787–1837), fantasy fiction writer, Dvoinik
 Evgeny Pogozhev (1870–1931), religious writer, essayist and journalist (pen name E. Poselyanin)
Konstantin Podrevsky (1888–1930), poet, translator, lyricist, Dorogoi dlinnoyu
Boris Polevoy (1908–1981), writer and journalist, The Story of a Real Man
Ksenofont Polevoy (1801–1867), writer, literary critic, journalist, publisher and translator
Nikolai Polevoy (1796–1846), writer, historian and magazine editor, The Moscow Telegraph 
Pyotr Polevoy (1839–1902), writer, playwright, translator, critic and literary historian
Alexander Polezhayev (1804–1838), satirical poet, Sashka 
Elizaveta Polonskaya (1890–1969), poet, translator, and journalist, the only female member of the Serapion Brothers
Leonid Polonsky (1833–1913), writer, journalist, editor and publisher, Mad Musician
Yakov Polonsky (1819–1898), poet, Georgian Night
Nikolay Pomyalovsky (1835–1863), novelist and short story writer, Seminary Sketches
Mikhail Popov (1742–1790), writer, poet, dramatist and opera librettist, Anyuta
Nikolay Popovsky (1730–1760), poet and translator
Vasili Popugaev (1778/79–1816), poet, novelist and translator
Oleg Postnov (born 1962), novelist and translator
Ignaty Potapenko (1856–1929), writer and playwright, A Russian Priest
Michael Prawdin (1894–1970), historical writer
Alexander Preys (1905–1942), playwright and librettist, The Nose
Dmitri Prigov (1940–2007), writer and artist, Live in Moscow
Zakhar Prilepin (born 1975), writer and dissident, member of the National Bolshevik Party
Maria Prilezhayeva (1903–1989), children's writer, The Life of Lenin
Mikhail Prishvin (1873–1954), journalist and writer
Valentyn Prodaievych (born 1960), journalist and writer, lives in Florida
Alexander Prokhanov (born 1938), writer and newspaper editor, Empire's Last Soldier 
Alexander Prokofyev (1900–1971), poet and war correspondent
Iosif Prut (1900–1996), playwright and screenwriter
Kozma Prutkov (1803–1863), satirist, pseudonym of Aleksey Konstantinovich Tolstoy and his cousins
Alexander Pushkin (1799–1837), poet, novelist and dramatist, Eugene Onegin
Vasily Pushkin (1766–1830), poet, uncle of Alexander Pushkin
Konstantin Pyatnitsky (1864–1938), journalist, publisher and memoirist

R

Alexander Radishchev (1749–1802), radical writer and social critic, Journey from St. Petersburg to Moscow
Edvard Radzinsky (born 1936), writer, playwright, TV personality, screenwriter and historian
Vladimir Rayevsky (1795–1872), poet and Decembrist
Valentin Rasputin (1937–2015), novelist, Farewell to Matyora
Irina Ratushinskaya (1954–2017) dissident poet and writer, Grey is the Color of Hope
Razumnik Ivanov-Razumnik (1878–1946), writer, philosopher and literary critic
Yevgeny Rein (born 1935), poet and writer, The Names of Bridges
Vera Reznik (born 1944), writer, translator and literary scholar
Aleksey Remizov (1877–1957), modernist writer, calligrapher and folklore enthusiast, The Clock, Sisters of the Cross
Fyodor Reshetnikov (1841–1871), novelist, The Podlipnayans
Mikhail Rosenheim (1820–1887), poet, editor, publicist and translator
Robert Rozhdestvensky (1932–1994), poet, Flags of Spring  
Helena Roerich (1879–1949), philosopher, writer and public figure
Nicholas Roerich (1874–1947), painter, philosopher, scientist, writer, traveler and public figure
Konstantin Romanov (1858–1915), poet and playwright, The King of the Jews
Panteleimon Romanov (1884–1938), writer, Without Bird-Cherry Blossoms
Mikhail Roshchin (1933–2010), playwright, screenwriter and short story writer
Yevdokiya Rostopchina (1811–1858), poet and writer, Forced Marriage
Vasily Rozanov (1856–1919), writer and philosopher
Robert Rozhdestvensky (1932–1994), poet, Flags of Spring 
Dina Rubina (born 1953), novelist and short story writer, The Blackthorn
Anatoly Rybakov (1911–1998), novelist, Children of the Arbat
Vladimir Rybakov (1947–2018), novelist and journalist, The Afghans: A Novella of Soviet Soldiers in Afghanistan
Vyacheslav Rybakov (born 1954), science fiction author and orientalist, The Trial Sphere
Maria Rybakova (born 1973), novelist and short story writer
Pavel Rybnikov (1831–1885), ethnographer, folklorist and literary historian
Kondraty Ryleyev (1795–1826), poet, publisher and a leader of the Decembrist Revolt
Yuri Rytkheu (1930–2008), Chukchi writer, A Dream in Polar Fog

S

Irina Saburova (1907–1979), writer, poet, translator, and magazine editor
Dmitry Sadovnikov (1847–1883), poet, folklorist and ethnographer, "Iz-za ostrova na strezhen"
Boris Sadovskoy (1881–1952), poet, writer and literary critic
German Sadulaev (born 1973), Chechen writer, I am a Chechen!
Evgeny Salias De Tournemire (1840–1908), writer, The Krutoyar Princess
Ilya Salov (1834–1902), writer, playwright and translator, Butuzka
Yuri Samarin (1819–1876), publicist and critic
Vladimir Sanin (1928–1989), writer of travel fiction
Genrikh Sapgir (1928–1999), poet and novelist
Mikhail Saltykov-Shchedrin (1826–1889), novelist, short story writer, playwright and essayist, The History of a Town, The Golovlyov Family
Boris Savinkov (1879–1925), writer and revolutionary terrorist, What Never Happened
Feodosy Savinov (1865–1915), poet, Rodnoye
Ilya Selvinsky (1899–1968), poet, leader of the constructivist school
Sergey Semyonov (1868–1922), peasant writer, Gluttons
Yulian Semyonov (1931–1993), writer of spy fiction and crime fiction, Seventeen Instants of Spring
Osip Senkovsky (1800–1858), Polish-Russian orientalist, journalist, writer and entertainer.
Alexander Serafimovich (1863–1949), writer, The Iron Flood
Andrey Sergeev (1933–1998), poet, translator and writer
Sergei Sergeyev-Tsensky (1875–1958), writer and academician, Brusilov's Breakthrough
Efraim Sevela (1928–2010), writer, screenwriter, director and producer
Igor Severyanin (1887–1941), ego futurist poet, The Cup of Thunder
Marietta Shaginyan (1888–1982), writer of Armenian descent, Mess-Mend
Alexander Shakhovskoy (1777–1846) playwright, writer, poet, librettist and critic, The New Stern
Varlam Shalamov (1907–1982), short story writer and poet, Kolyma Tales
Olga Shapir (1850–1916), writer and feminist, The Settlement
Pyotr Shchebalsky (1810–1886), critic, editor and literary historian
Tatiana Shchepkina-Kupernik (1874–1952), poet, writer, playwright and translator, Deborah
Vladimir Shchiglev (1840–1903), satirical poet and playwright
Stepan Shchipachev (1889–1980), poet, Lines of Love 
Vadim Shefner (1915–2002), poet and writer
Alexander Sheller (1838–1900), writer, poet and essayist, Putrid Moors
Nikolay Sherbina (1821–1869), poet, To the Sea
Vadim Shershenevich (1893–1942), futurist poet, writer and screenwriter, A Kiss From Mary Pickford
Stepan Shevyryov (1806–1864), poet, writer, critic and philologist 
Mikhail Shishkin (born 1961), modern writer, The Taking of Izmail 
Vyacheslav Shishkov (1873–1945), writer, known for his descriptions of Siberia
Maria Shkapskaya (1891–1952), poet and journalist
Ivan Shmelyov (1873–1950), novelist, The Sun of the Dead
Mikhail Sholokhov (1905–1984), Nobel Prize–winning writer, And Quiet Flows the Don
Gennady Shpalikov (1937–1974), poet and screenwriter, I Step Through Moscow
Nikolai Shpanov (1896–1961), author
Vasily Shukshin (1929–1974), actor, writer, screenwriter and movie director, Roubles in Words, Kopeks in Figures 
Pavel Shumil (born 1957), science fiction author
Evgeny Shvarts (1896–1958), writer, playwright and screenwriter, The Dragon 
Konstantin Simonov (1915–1979), novelist and poet, "Wait for Me" 
Andrei Sinyavsky (1925–1997), writer, publisher and dissident, Fantastic Stories
Alexander Skabichevsky (1838–1911), writer and literary critic 
Stepan Skitalets (1869–1941), poet and writer, The Love of a Scene Painter
Victor Skumin (born 1948), writer and magazine editor
Olga Slavnikova (born 1957), novelist and literary critic
Vasily Sleptsov (1836–1878), novelist, short story writer and playwright, Hard Times, "The Ward"
Konstantin Sluchevsky (1837–1904), poet and magazine editor
Boris Slutsky (1919–1986), representative of the War generation of Russian poets
Nikolai Snessarev (1856–1928), publicist, writer, literary critic and politician
Sofia Soboleva (1840–1884), writer and journalist, Pros and Cons
Anatoly Sofronov (1911–1990), writer, poet, playwright, scriptwriter, editor and literary administrator, The Cookie
Sasha Sokolov (born 1943), novelist, A School for Fools
Ivan Sokolov-Mikitov (1882–1975), author, journalist and short-story writer, Childhood
Vladimir Sollogub (1813–1882), writer and poet, The Snowstorm
Fyodor Sologub (1863–1927), symbolist poet, playwright and novelist, The Petty Demon
Vladimir Soloukhin (1924–1997), writer, journalist and poet, Verdict
Leonid Solovyov (1906–1962), writer and playwright, Tale of Hodja Nasreddin 
Vladimir Solovyov (1853–1900), philosopher, poet, pamphleteer and literary critic
Aleksandr Solzhenitsyn (1918–2008), Nobel Prize–winning writer, One Day in the Life of Ivan Denisovich, The Gulag Archipelago 
Orest Somov (1793–1833), writer, journalist, literary critic and translator, Mommy and Sonny
Vladimir Sorokin (born 1955), popular postmodern writer and dramatist
Konstantin Staniukovich (1843–1903), sea stories writer, Maximka
Mikhail Stasyulevich (1826–1911), writer, literary historian, editor and publisher
Vladimir Stavsky (1900–1943), writer, editor and literary administrator, Fighting for Motherland
Alexander Stein (1906–1993), writer, playwright, scriptwriter and memoirist
Ksenya Stepanycheva (born 1978), playwright, Pink Bow
Sergey Stepnyak-Kravchinsky (1851–1895), writer, publicist and revolutionary, King Stork and King Log 
Fyodor Stepun (1884–1965), Russian-German writer, philosopher, historian and sociologist
Dmitry Strelnikov (born 1969), poet, essayist and novelist
Arkady and Boris Strugatsky (Arkady 1925–1991) (Boris 1933–2012), science fiction writers, Hard to Be a God
Aleksandr Sukhovo-Kobylin (1817–1903), playwright, Scenes from the Past
Alexander Sumarokov (1717–1777), early poet and playwright 
Ivan Surikov (1841–1880), peasant poet
Alexey Surkov (1899–1983), poet, editor, literary critic, "Zemlyanka" 
Mikhail Sushkov (1775–1792), writer, The Russian Werther
Alexei Suvorin (1834–1912), publisher and journalist
Viktor Suvorov (born 1947), writer and historian
Fyodor Svarovsky (born 1971), poet
Mikhail Svetlov (1903–1964), poet and journalist, Song of Kakhovka

T

Yelizaveta Tarakhovskaya (1891–1968), poet, playwright, translator and children's writer
Alexander Tarasov-Rodionov (1885–1938), writer, Chocolate
Arseny Tarkovsky (1907–1989), poet and translator
Valery Tarsis (1906–1983), novelist and dissident, Ward 7
Nadezhda Teffi (1872–1952), humorist writer, All About Love
Nikolay Teleshov (1867–1957), writer and memoirist, organizer of the Moscow Sreda 
Vladimir Tendryakov (1923–1984), novelist and short story writer, Three, Seven, Ace
Yuri Terapiano (1892–1980), poet, writer, translator, literary critic and historian
Sergey Terpigorev (1841–1895), writer and essayist
Nikolai Tikhonov (1896–1979), writer and poet, member of the Serapion Brothers 
Vladislav Titov (1934–1987), novelist who lost both arms in a coal mine accident, Defying Death 
Pyotr Tkachev (1844–1886), publicist, writer and critic
Viktoriya Tokareva (born 1937), screenwriter and short story writer
Aleksey Konstantinovich Tolstoy (1817–1875), poet, dramatist and novelist, The Death of Ivan the Terrible
Aleksey Nikolayevich Tolstoy (1882–1945), novelist and science fiction writer, The Garin Death Ray
Ilya Tolstoy (1866–1933), author of a memoir about his father Leo Tolstoy
Leo Tolstoy (1828–1910) novelist, short story writer, playwright, essayist and public figure, War and Peace, Anna Karenina, The Death of Ivan Ilyich, Resurrection, Hadji Murat
Tatyana Tolstaya (born 1951), writer, TV host, publicist, novelist and essayist
Edward Topol (born 1938), novelist and journalist, Red Square
Sergey Trakhimenok (born 1950), novelist, playwrights, screenwriter and short story writer, detective story writer
Vasily Trediakovsky (1703–1768), poet, essayist and playwright 
Konstantin Trenyov (1876–1945), playwright and short story writer, Lyubov Yarovaya 
Sergei Tretyakov (1892–1937), playwright, I Want a Baby 
Yury Trifonov (1925–1981), novelist and short story writer, The House on the Embankment
Gavriil Troyepolsky (1905–1995), novelist, White Bim Black Ear
Mikhail Tsetlin (1882–1945), poet, playwright, novelist, memoirist and translator
Marina Tsvetaeva (1892–1941), poet and essayist, The Rat-Catcher
Alexei Tsvetkov (born 1947), poet, novelist and journalist
Nikolai Tsyganov (1797–1832), poet, folklorist, singer and actor, Russian Songs
Evgenia Tur (1815–1892), writer, critic, journalist and publisher, Antonina
Sergey Turbin (1821–1884), playwright and journalist
Ivan Turgenev (1818–1883), novelist and playwright, A Sportsman's Sketches, Home of the Gentry, Fathers and Sons
Veronika Tushnova (1911–1965), poet and translator, Memory of the Heart  
Aleksandr Tvardovsky (1910–1971), poet, war correspondent and editor of Novy Mir, Vasily Tyorkin 
Yury Tynyanov (1894–1943), writer, literary critic, translator, scholar and screenwriter
Fyodor Tyutchev (1803–1873), poet, The Last Love

U

Vladimir Uflyand (1937–2007), poet, The Working Week Comes To An End
Pavel Ulitin (1918–1986), writer
Lyudmila Ulitskaya (born 1943), novelist and short-story writer, Medea and Her Children
Alexander Urusov (1843–1900), literary critic, translator, lawyer and philanthropist
Eduard Uspensky (1937–2018), children's writer, Cheburashka series
Gleb Uspensky (1843–1902), novelist, short story writer and essayist, The Power of the Land
Nikolay Uspensky (1837–1889), short story writer, A Good Existence 
Iosif Utkin (1903–1944), poet and journalist, Dear Childhood

V

Konstantin Vaginov (1899–1934), poet and novelist, Goat Song, The Works and Days of Svistonov
Pyotr Valuyev (1815–1890), statesman, novelist, poet and essayist
Alexander Vampilov (1937–1972), playwright, Elder Son
Mikhail Veller (born 1948), writer and journalist, The Guru 
Alexander Veltman (1800–1870), writer, one of the pioneers of Russian science fiction
Dmitry Venevitinov (1805–1827), philosophical poet
Anastasiya Verbitskaya (1861–1928), novelist, playwright, screenplay writer, publisher and feminist, The Keys to Happiness
Vikenty Veresaev (1867–1945), writer and medical doctor, Memoirs of a Physician
Lidia Veselitskaya (1857–1936), writer, translator and memoirist, Mimi's Marriage
Sergey Vikulov (1922–2006), poet, essayist, memoirist and editor, Nash Sovremennik
Tony Vilgotsky (born 1980), horror and fantasy writer, columnist
Nikolai Virta (1906–1976), writer and playwright, Alone
Vsevolod Vishnevsky (1900–1951), playwright, Optimistic Tragedy
Igor Vishnevetsky (born 1964), poet and music historian
Georgi Vladimov (1931–2003), dissident writer, Faithful Ruslan 
Dmitry Vodennikov (born 1968), poet and essayist
Vladimir Voinovich (1932–2018), satirical novelist, The Life and Extraordinary Adventures of Private Ivan Chonkin
Zinaida Volkonskaya (1792–1862), writer, poet, singer, composer, salonist and lady in waiting
Alexander Volkov (1891–1977), novelist and mathematician, The Wizard of the Emerald City
Anri Volokhonsky (1936–2017), poet and translator
Maximilian Voloshin (1877–1932), poet, translator, art and literary critic 
Konstantin Vorobyov (1919–1975), writer, Slain Near Moscow
Vatslav Vorovsky (1871–1923), Marxist revolutionary, literary critic, diplomat and publicist
Julia Voznesenskaya (1940–2015), novelist, The Women's Decameron
Zoya Voskresenskaya (1907–1992), children's writer, diplomat, NKVD foreign office secret agent, Mother's Heart
Andrei Voznesensky (1933–2010), poet and writer, First Frost
Alexander Vvedensky (1904–1941), poet, co-founder of OBERIU
Arseny Vvedensky (1844–1909), writer, journalist, literary critic and historian
Pyotr Vyazemsky (1792–1878), poet, representative of the Golden Age of Russian poetry
Vladimir Vysotsky (1938–1980), singer, songwriter, poet and actor

Y

Alexander Yakovlev (1886–1953), writer and essayist, The Peasant
Pyotr Yakubovich (1860–1911), poet and writer, member of Narodnaya Volya
Pavel Yakushkin (1822–1872),  writer, ethnographer and folklorist
Alexander Yashin (1913–1968), writer associated with the Village Prose movement
Ieronim Yasinsky (1850–1931), novelist, poet, essayist and memoirist
Nikolay Yazykov (1803–1846), poet and slavophile
Ivan Yefremov (1908–1972), paleontologist, science fiction author and social thinker, Andromeda
Dmitri Yemets (born 1974), author of fantasy literature for children and young adults, Tanya Grotter
Venedikt Yerofeyev (1938–1990), writer and playwright, Moscow-Petushki
Pyotr Yershov (1815–1869), fairy tale writer, poet and playwright, The Humpbacked Horse
Sergei Yesenin (1895–1925), poet, Land of Scoundrels
Tatyana Yesenina (1918–1992), writer and daughter of Sergei Yesenin, Zhenya, the Wonder of the Twentieth Century
Yevgeny Yevtushenko (1933–2017), poet, novelist, essayist, dramatist, screenwriter, actor, editor, and film director
Semyon Yushkevich (1868–1927), writer and playwright

Z

Nikolay Zabolotsky (1903–1958), poet, children's writer and translator, one of the founders of the absurdist group OBERIU
Boris Zakhoder (1918–2000), poet, children's writer and translator
Mikhail Zagoskin (1789–1852), historical novelist, Tales of Three Centuries
Boris Zaitsev (1881–1972), writer and playwright, Anna
Mark Zakharov (1933–2019), theatrical director, playwright and actor
Sergey Zalygin (1913–2000), novelist and magazine editor, The South American Variant
Yevgeny Zamyatin (1884–1937), novelist, short story writer and playwright, We
Vsevolod Zelchenko (born 1972), poet
Mikhail Zenkevich (1886–1973), poet and translator, Wild Porphyry
Yulia Zhadovskaya (1824–1883), poet and writer, Apart from the Great World 
Vera Zhelikhovsky (1835–1896), novelist and children's writer, The General's Will
Aleksey Zhemchuzhnikov (1821–1908), poet and dramatist, co-creator of Kozma Prutkov
Boris Zhitkov (1882–1938), novelist, short story writer, playwright and children's writer, Viktor Vavich
Maria Zhukova (1804–1855), writer, Evenings on the Karpovka 
Vasily Zhukovsky (1783–1852), poet, translator and magazine editor 
Zinovy Zinik (born 1945), novelist and broadcaster, The Mushroom-Picker
Lydia Zinovieva-Annibal (1866–1907), writer and playwright, The Tragic Menagerie  
Nikolai Zlatovratsky (1845–1911), novelist and short story writer, Old Shadows
Mikhail Znamensky (1833–1892), writer, memoirist, caricaturist, archeologist and ethnographer, The Vanished Men
Mikhail Zoshchenko (1895–1958), satirical short story writer and novelist, The Galosh
Rafail Zotov (1795–1871), playwright, novelist, journalist, translator and theatre critic, Jealous Wife

See also

List of Russian artists
List of Russian architects
List of Russian inventors
List of Russian explorers
Russian culture

 
Russian
Writers